Kim Jong-su ( or  ; born January 1, 1977) is a North Korean sport shooter who competed at the 2004 Summer Olympics in Athens and 2008 Summer Olympics in Beijing. In Athens, he won the bronze medal in the 50 metre pistol competition, and finished eighth in the air pistol final. In Beijing, he won a silver medal in 50 metre pistol and a bronze medal in 10 metre air pistol, but was later disqualified for doping and stripped of both medals.

As a competitor at the 2008 Olympics
Kim competed in the 10 metre air pistol event during the 2008 Olympics on August 9, where he came third in the qualification round, with 584 points, and again third in the final round, with 683.0 points, initially earning a bronze medal. Three days later, he then competed in the 50 metre pistol event, where he scored 563 and 660.2 points for qualification and final rounds respectively, thus earning a silver medal.

Propranolol doping
On August 15, 2008, three days after Kim won his third Olympic medal, the International Olympic Committee announced that he had tested positive for the banned substance propranolol during a doping test. Propranolol is a beta blocker that is mainly used to treat hypertension, but also prevents trembling. Kim was stripped of his two medals from the 2008 Summer Olympics, making Kim the second athlete, and first medal winning athlete, to test positive for a banned substance at the 2008 Olympic Games. In the 10 metre air pistol, the bronze medal went to Jason Turner of the United States. In the 50 metre pistol, the silver medal went to Tan Zongliang of China, and the bronze medal went to Vladimir Isakov of Russia.

Media response within North Korea
While media outside North Korea reported on Kim's disqualification, the Korean Central News Agency did not report on the incident. On August 15, the day when Kim Jong-su officially had his medals revoked, the KCNA reported:

Kim Jong Su placed second in the men's 50 metre free pistol and third in the men's 10 meter air pistol.

No news reports since August 15 have mention of Kim's disqualification.

Performance timelines

50 metre pistol

25 metre center-fire pistol

25 metre standard pistol

10 metre air pistol 

Kim has not appeared in the Olympics since 2008 and last appeared in competition in 2010 during the Asian Games.

References

External links
 
 

1977 births
Living people
North Korean male sport shooters
ISSF pistol shooters
Olympic shooters of North Korea
Shooters at the 2004 Summer Olympics
Shooters at the 2008 Summer Olympics
Shooters at the 2016 Summer Olympics
Olympic bronze medalists for North Korea
Medalists at the 2004 Summer Olympics
Doping cases in shooting
Asian Games medalists in shooting
Olympic medalists in shooting
Competitors stripped of Summer Olympics medals
North Korean sportspeople in doping cases
Shooters at the 1998 Asian Games
Shooters at the 2002 Asian Games
Shooters at the 2006 Asian Games
Shooters at the 2010 Asian Games
Asian Games gold medalists for North Korea
Asian Games silver medalists for North Korea
Asian Games bronze medalists for North Korea
Medalists at the 1998 Asian Games
Medalists at the 2002 Asian Games
Medalists at the 2006 Asian Games
Medalists at the 2010 Asian Games